NWC may stand for:
NASCAR Winston Cup
National War College
National Weather Center
National Whistleblower Center
National Working Committee
National Wrestling Conference, wrestling promotion
Native wifi calling, direct support in mobile OS for VoWifi
Naval War College
Netball World Championships
Network-centric warfare
Net working capital
New World Computing
Nintendo Wi-Fi Connection
Nintendo World Championships
Norbert Wiener Center for Harmonic Analysis and Applications
Northwestern College (Iowa)
Northwestern College (Minnesota)
Northwestern College (Wisconsin) now part of Martin Luther College
Northwest Conference
Northwest College in Powell, Wyoming
North West Company
NoteWorthy Composer, a graphical score editor (software used for creating sheet music) or its .nwc file extension.